Bolyphantes is a genus of  dwarf spiders that was first described by Carl Ludwig Koch in 1837.

Species
 it contains seventeen species:
Bolyphantes alticeps (Sundevall, 1833) – Europe, Caucasus, Russia (Europe to Far East), Central Asia, China, Japan
Bolyphantes bipartitus (Tanasevitch, 1989) – Kazakhstan, Kyrgyzstan
Bolyphantes distichoides Tanasevitch, 2000 – Russia (South Siberia)
Bolyphantes distichus (Tanasevitch, 1986) – Russia (West to South Siberia), Kazakhstan
Bolyphantes elburzensis Tanasevitch, 2009 – Iran
Bolyphantes kilpisjaerviensis Palmgren, 1975 – Finland
Bolyphantes kolosvaryi (Caporiacco, 1936) – France, Switzerland, Italy, Balkans
Bolyphantes lagodekhensis (Tanasevitch, 1990) – Georgia
Bolyphantes lamellaris Tanasevitch, 1990 – Italy, Greece, Russia (Caucasus)
Bolyphantes luteolus (Blackwall, 1833) (type) – Europe, Russia (Europe to South Siberia), China
Bolyphantes mongolicus Loksa, 1965 – Mongolia
Bolyphantes nigropictus Simon, 1884 – Western Mediterranean
Bolyphantes punctulatus (Holm, 1939) – Scandinavia, Russia (Urals, north-eastern Siberia to Far East)
Bolyphantes sacer (Tanasevitch, 1986) – Kyrgyzstan
Bolyphantes severtzovi Tanasevitch, 1989 – Central Asia
Bolyphantes subtiliseta Tanasevitch, 2019 – France (Corsica)
Bolyphantes supremus (Tanasevitch, 1986) – Kyrgyzstan

See also
 List of Linyphiidae species

References

Araneomorphae genera
Linyphiidae
Palearctic spiders
Spiders of Asia
Taxa named by Carl Ludwig Koch